Convenient Hospitals Ltd. (CHL) Hospital, Indore is a hospital in Indore, India.

CHL is managed and owned by the Convenient Hospitals Ltd (CHL Group), Indore. Now it is acquired by Hyderabad-based Care Group hospital. The deal was valued at ₹350-400 crore. The facility is a 225-bed multi-specialty critical care hospital located on A.B Road.

References

Hospitals in Madhya Pradesh
Buildings and structures in Indore
Year of establishment missing